Bharat Forge Limited is an Indian multinational company involved in forging, automotives, energy, construction and mining, railways, marine, aerospace and defence industries.

History 
The company was founded by Nilkanthrao A. Kalyani on 19 June 1961. Headquartered in Pune, Maharashtra, it is the flagship company of the Kalyani Group. Bharat Forge's Special Economic Zone (SEZ) named Khed City is spread over an area of 1,000 hectares (4200 acres) in Khed taluka, and is the largest SEZ in Pune district. t was the first company promoted by the Kalyani Group and remains the Group's flagship company. The current chairman of the company is the founder's son, Baba Kalyani.

Bharat Forge's products include front axle beams, steering knuckles, connecting rods and crankshafts. The new strategy is to augument a strong global footprint in Lightweight materials. As part of its risk mitigation efforts, Bharat Forge diversified into a variety of industrial sectors including oil & gas, infrastructure, and marine. Some of BFL's largest customers include Daimler Group, VW Group, Meritor and Dana etc. The company also has an extensive collaboration with major truck manufacturers.

Bharat Forge's Investment and Windmills divisions were demerged to a new company named BF Utilities Limited on 15 September 2000.

Manufacturing 
Currently Bharat Forge is the "world’s largest single location forging facility consisting of fully automated forging press lines and  state-of-the-art machining facility." It has manufacturing operations in four locations:
 Mundhwa: forging and machining facility spread across 100 acres;
 Satara: general engineering division;
 Baramati: forging and machining facility, known for its ring rolling presses;
 Chakan: machining facility;

Subsidiaries 
Bharat Forge Kilsta, Bharat Forge CDP, and BF Aluminiumtechnik are the company's Europe-based forging units. Other subsidiaries of Bharat Forge include:

Kalyani Strategic Systems 
Kalyani Strategic Systems Ltd. (KSSL) is a defence manufacturer that supplies components and subsystems to the Indian Armed Forces, and exports to other countries. The company holds an Industrial License under the Arms Act, 1959. In May 2021, Bharat Forge announced that it would raise its stake in KSSL from 51% to 100%.

Kalyani Rafael Advanced Systems 
Kalyani Rafael Advanced Systems (KRAS) is joint venture between KSSL and Israeli defence company Rafael Advanced Defense Systems established in 2015. KSSL holds a 51% stake, while Rafael holds the remaining 49%. The Kalyani Group claimed that it was the first private sector advanced defence subsystems manufacturing company in India. KRAS manufactures electro-optics, remote weapon systems, precision guided munitions and system engineering for system integration. KRAS established a 24,000 sq ft defence manufacturing facility in Hyderabad, Telangana in August 2017.

The first product planned to be produced at the facility was the Israeli Spike anti-tank guided missiles (ATGM). However, the Government of India assigned the ATGM programme to the Defence Research and Development Organisation, after which KRAS pivoted to producing Spice 2000 bombs. In July 2019, KRAS received a $100 million contract to produce 1,000  Barak 8 medium-range surface-to-air missiles (MR-SAM) for the Indian Army and Air Force. On 16 March 2021, KRAS announced that it had begun delivery of the first batch of MR-SAMs. This was the second  product built at the Hyderabad plant.

Sharp India
Kalyani Telecommunications & Electronics Pvt. Ltd. was incorporated on 5 July 1985 by Bharat Forge. The company manufactured black and white and colour television sets, and videocassette recorders under the brand name Optonica. It became a public limited company on 20 September 1985. The company was renamed Kalyani Sharp India Ltd. on 2 May 1986. Japan's Sharp Corporation acquired a 40% stake in Kalyani Sharp India Ltd. in 1990. The company was renamed Sharp India Ltd. in 2005.

Former subsidiaries

Alstom Bharat Forge Power
Alstom Bharat Forge Power Limited was a joint venture with French company Alstom. Originally, Alstom held a 51% stake and Bharat Forge held the remaining 49%. Alstom's shares were acquired by American conglomerate General Electric on 25 November 2015 as part of its global acquisition of Alstom's energy business. Alstom Bharat Forge won a contract to supply two units of 660 MW supercritical coal turbines to NTPC Limited for a power plant in Solapur, Maharashtra. Alstom Bharat Forge began production of supercritical turbines and generators at a new manufacturing facility at Sanand, Gujarat in May 2016. The company won a contract to supply two units of 800 MW ultra-supercritical steam turbine generator islands for the Telangana Super Thermal Power Project Phase-1 near Ramagundam. On 8 November 2016, the board of Bharat Forge approved the exit of the company from Alstom Bharat Forge Power. In March 2017, Bharat Forge announced that it would divest 23% of its shares to GE, and the remaining 26% stake was divested in February 2018 completing Bharat Forge's exit from Alstom Bharat Forge Power.

References

External links
 
 Kalyani Strategic Systems website
 Kalyani Rafael Advanced Systems website

Manufacturing companies established in 1961
Companies based in Pune
Multinational companies headquartered in India
Manufacturing companies of India
1961 establishments in Maharashtra
Companies listed on the National Stock Exchange of India
Companies listed on the Bombay Stock Exchange
Indian companies established in 1961